Van Harold Green (born April 21, 1951) is a former American football defensive back who played four seasons in the National Football League with the Cleveland Browns and Buffalo Bills. He was drafted by the Cleveland Browns in the sixth round of the 1973 NFL Draft. He played college football at Shaw University and attended Auburndale High School in Auburndale, Florida.

References

External links
Just Sports Stats
NFL trading card

Living people
1951 births
African-American players of American football
American football defensive backs
Buffalo Bills players
Cleveland Browns players
People from Auburndale, Florida
Players of American football from Florida
Shaw Bears football players
Sportspeople from Polk County, Florida
21st-century African-American people
20th-century African-American sportspeople